Pen Resource University, established by Pen Resource Academy (PRA), is a private, co-educational group of schools in Gombe, Gombe State, in north-eastern Nigeria. It is among twelve private universities approved to be established by the Federal Executive Council (FEC) on April 6, 2022. It became licensed by the Nigeria Universities Commission (NUC) in May 2022.

History 
Pen Resource University is the first private university in Gombe State and the third in north-eastern Nigeria. It was established by Dr. Sani Jauro as Pen Resource Academy. The school is situated in the village of Lafiyawo along Gombe-Bauchi road, Gombe, Gombe State, and focuses on educating students in digital and other twenty-first century-relevant skills.

Faculties 
The university has three faculties:

 Faculty of Science and Computing;
 Faculty of Law; and
 Faculty of Communications, Management and Social Sciences.

Departments 
The faculty of science has five departments:

 Department of chemical sciences;
 Department of computer science;
 Department of Building; and
 Department of Architecture.

The faculty of Law has two departments:

 Islamic Law; and
 Public and private law

The faculty of Communications, Management and Social Sciences has five departments:

 Accounting and Finance;
 Business Administration;
 Communication;
 Economics; and
 Political Science.

Vice Chancellor 
Professor Ogbaji Igoli, a United Kingdom-based Professor of Chemistry, is the pioneer Vice Chancellor of the university.

Pro Chancellor 
Dr. Sani Jauro is the Pro-Chancellor and Chairman of the Governing Council of Pen Resource University.

References 

Universities and colleges in Nigeria